Events in the year 1906 in Spain.

Incumbents
Monarch: Alfonso XIII
Prime Minister: 
 until 6 July: Segismundo Moret
 6 July-30 November: José López Domínguez
 30 November-4 December: Segismundo Moret
 starting 4 December: Antonio Aguilar Correa

Births
February 25 - Domingo Ortega. (d. 1988)
February 27 - Néstor Álamo. (d. 1994)
May 16 - José Pastor. 
September 4 - Luis Marín Sabater. (d. 1974)

Deaths

June 23 - Juan Manuel Sánchez, Duke of Almodóvar del Río.

References

 
Years of the 20th century in Spain
1900s in Spain
Spain
Spain